Tomás Eduardo Morató Bernabéu (July 4, 1887 – March 6, 1965) was a Spanish-born Filipino businessman and politician of Valencian ethnicity and full-blooded Spanish descent who became Mayor of Calauag, Quezon before he became the first Quezon City Mayor from 1939 to 1942.

Early life and career
Morató was born on July 4, 1887, in the picturesque seaport of Alicante on the Mediterranean coast of Spain to Francisco Morató Arabí and Josefa Bernabéu Ferrer. His father was a ship captain who sailed from Spain to the Philippines and frequently stopped at the coastal town of Calauag, Tayabas. An only son, Tomás was brought to Calauag in 1898 by his father. There the 13-year-old boy first met and studied with the 22-year-old Quezon. Tomás finished his engineering course and entered the lumber business where he amassed quite a fortune. By virtue of a provision in the Treaty of Paris which granted Filipino citizenship to all Spaniards who have decided to stay in the Philippines, Morató became a Filipino citizen.

Friendship with Quezon
 
It was in Baler where he met Manuel L. Quezon, the 2nd President of the Philippines, and became friends with him. His friendship with Quezon was a rare and unique one. They courted girls together and helped each other during difficult times.

When Quezon was elected president in 1935, he entered Malacañan for the first time with Morató and Manuel L. "Nonong" Quezon, Jr. And thereafter, Morató was one of the very few people who could enter Malacañan at all times, even staying overnight in some often cases.

Quezon himself urged Morató to enter politics, so he ran as Mayor of Calauag and won with ease. At his second term, Quezon invited him to help build a new city, a city that would later be known as Quezon City.

Mayor of Quezon City (1939–1942)
Morató was a leader full of energy, taking difficult tasks that hinders growth and progress of the new city. Even though his administration faced low funds, it was able to create a network of new roads, and maintenance of satisfactory health conditions. With a police force of 48, crime rates remained at controlled levels. He also promoted social and economic programs to alleviate the condition of the residents.

The first musical piece composed for Quezon City was the “Quezon City March”, which was composed by Amando Calleja and the lyrics made by Jesús Balmori. The sponsors of this musical piece were the officials and members of the Cubao Women's Club headed by Morató's wife.

He was arrested by the Imperial Japanese troops when Quezon City had been taken over by the Japanese. This ended his term as the mayor of the city and was paroled and exiled on July 19, 1942, during World War II.

Death
He died on March 6, 1965; his remains were interred at the Manila North Cemetery, Manila.

Legacy
The popular restaurant row Tomas Morato Avenue, as well as a road in San Francisco del Monte, Quezon City were named after him. A barangay (Don Tomas) and a street in Calauag, Quezon were also named in memory of the last municipal President and first municipal Mayor of Calauag, Quezon.

Notes

References

External links

1887 births
1965 deaths
Burials at the Manila North Cemetery
Liberal Party (Philippines) politicians
Mayors of Quezon City
Filipino engineers
Members of the House of Representatives of the Philippines from Quezon
Members of the National Assembly (Second Philippine Republic)
Nacionalista Party politicians
Naturalized citizens of the Philippines
People of Spanish colonial Philippines
People from Alicante
People from Quezon City
Spanish emigrants to the Philippines
20th-century Filipino businesspeople